This is a list of all lighthouses in the U.S. state of Michigan as identified by the United States Coast Guard. Michigan is home to lights on four of the Great Lakes, Lake St. Clair and connecting waterways.

The first lighthouse in the state, Fort Gratiot Light, was erected in 1825. It is still active. The Michigan.gov website has a Map of Michigan Lighthouses in PDF format.

If not otherwise noted, focal height and coordinates are taken from the United States Coast Guard Light List, while location and dates of activation, automation, and deactivation are taken from the United States Coast Guard Historical information site for lighthouses.
(below, 129, Active, Inactive, Moved, Museum; 24, Destroyed)

See also
Ladies of the Lights

Notes

References

External links

General
Midwest Lighthouses - United States Lighthouses

 
Lighthouses
Michigan
Lighthouses